Lara Denis (born April 17, 1969) is an American philosopher and Professor of Philosophy and Director of Ethics Program at Agnes Scott College.
She is known for her works on Kantian ethics.
Denis is a former President of Phi Beta Kappa (2007-2008).

Books
Kant’s Lectures on Ethics: A Critical Guide (Cambridge University Press, 2015), co-editor with Oliver Sensen 
 Kant’s ‘Metaphysics of Morals’: A Critical Guide (Cambridge University Press, 2010) [editor] 
 Kant’s Groundwork for the Metaphysics of Morals (Peterborough, Ontario: Broadview Press, 2005) [editor]
 Moral Self-Regard: Duties to Oneself in Kant’s Moral Theory (New York: Garland 2001), part of the Studies in Ethics series, edited by Robert Nozick

References

20th-century American philosophers
Philosophy academics
1969 births
Living people
Agnes Scott College faculty
Cornell University alumni